Three ships of the British Royal Navy have been named HMS Napier, in honor of Admiral Charles Napier.

 The first Napier was a 445-ton iron river gunboat built at Bombay Dockyard, launched 11 September 1844, and in the records until 1858.
 The second  was an  launched in 1916 and sold in 1921.
 The third  was an  launched in 1940 and loaned to the Royal Australian Navy during World War II. She was broken up in 1956.

Royal Navy ship names